Daniel Larsson (born 9 June 1981) is a Swedish professional darts player.

Career

Larsson reached the semi final of the 2006 WDF Europe Cup, scoring wins over Tony O'Shea and Martin Phillips before losing to Niels de Ruiter. He then reached the final of the Sweden National Championship, losing to Alan Norris.

On 4 December 2008 Larsson qualified for the 2009 BDO World Darts Championship, winning one of five spots. He defeated Steve Farmer in the earlier rounds and then beat Paul Gibbs and Stephen Bunting to qualify. He was drawn against O'Shea in the first round and lost 3–0.

In 2018 Larsson competed on the PDC Nordic & Baltic Pro Tour, finishing in the top two to qualify for the 2019 PDC World Darts Championship. In the first round he defeated Robert Thornton in his best win to date before losing to Kim Huybrechts in the second round.

On 19 January 2020, Larsson won a two-year PDC Tour Card by finishing fifth on the European Q School Order of Merit. He will play on the ProTour in 2020 and 2021.

World Championship results

BDO
 2009: First round (lost to Tony O'Shea 0–3)
 2015: First round (lost to Alan Norris 2–3)

PDC
 2019: Second round (lost to Kim Huybrechts 0–3)
 2021: First round (lost to Steve Lennon 1–3)
 2022: First round (lost to Jason Lowe 0–3)
 2023: First round (lost to Adrian Lewis 0–3)

Performance timeline

PDC European Tour

References

External links

Living people
Swedish darts players
1981 births
British Darts Organisation players
Professional Darts Corporation former tour card holders
People from Uppsala
PDC World Cup of Darts Swedish team